Tania Verstak (born 20 November 1940) is an Australian model and beauty queen who won Miss International 1962.

Early life
Verstak was born in Tianjin, China, to Russian couple Vladimir and Valentina Verstak. They emigrated to Australia when she was 10 years old and settled in Manly, New South Wales. In 1961, she became the first migrant to win the Miss Australia title.

Pageants

Even before going on to compete in Miss International, Verstak's victory in the national pageant was already seen as a small but significant shift in the traditional articulation of the Australian feminine ideal, attributed to the infusion of European values to the Anglo-Australian fabric, at a time when beauty pageants were the craze in Australia.

Verstak went on to win the Miss International title in Long Beach, California. Thus, the victory further endeared her to the Australian public, demonstrating their pride and approval of Tania Verstak as the embodiment of perfect Australian womanhood and as the image of Australia as a modern nation, even though in the terminology of the time for immigrants, she was a "new Australian".

Verstak's first relationship was with former Channel 7 rugby league commentator, 'sideline eye' Barry Ross. After an acrimonious split, Verstak later married a Perth businessman, Peter Young. Their daughter is the actress Nina Young.

References

External links
 ABC: George Negus interview with Tania Verstak, 14 April 2003
 Collection of Tania Verstak's trophies, photographs and dresses, National Museum of Australia

Miss International winners
Living people
1940 births
Chinese emigrants to Australia
Models from Sydney
Australian beauty pageant winners
Australian people of Russian descent
Miss International 1962 delegates